Annie Baxter is a radio reporter and journalist for Minnesota Public Radio in the United States.

She worked with This American Life for NPR Chicago before becoming a reporter in Minnesota, where she is a regular contributor. She has also been featured on the popular program Morning Edition.

References

Living people
Year of birth missing (living people)
NPR personalities
Place of birth missing (living people)